The Ciyao–Laiwu railway or Cilai railway, is a railroad in northern China between Ciyao and Laiwu central Shandong Province. The line,  in length, was built in two sections from 1940 to 1943 and 1959 to 1966, and is primarily used to transport coal and minerals mined near Laiwu.

History
In 1916, a railway line near Ciyao was planned by the Huafeng Coal Company, but was not built.  During World War II when Shandong was occupied by Japan, a Japanese company built a  railroad between Dongtaiping (now named Ciyao) and Chichai (now Yucun) from 1940 to 1941.  This line was extended  to the Xinwen coal mines in Nanxintai (now Dongdu) in 1943, and the combined line,   in length, became known as the Ciyao–Dongdu railway.  The Dongdu to Laiwu section,  in length, was built from 1959 to 1966, forming a tilted L-shaped railway.

Rail connections
 Ciyao: Beijing–Shanghai railway
 Dongdu: Dongdu–Pingyi railway
 Laiwu: Xindian–Taian railway

See also

 List of railways in China

References

Railway lines in China
Rail transport in Shandong